Larbert High School is a six-year, non-denominational state school in Stenhousemuir, Scotland, United Kingdom (UK). The school is run by Falkirk Council Education Services on behalf of the Scottish Government. In 2005, the total running costs of the school were £5,852,498 or £3,553 per pupil. The current rector is Jon Reid.

The school was inspected by HM Inspectorate of Education in the 2016/17 session and found to be "Excellent" in the category of "Leadership of Change" and "Very Good" across all other categories. Larbert High was the first school to achieve an "Excellent" rating.

As of August 2021 the school roll was 2050 pupils with expectations of growth in future years to come and reach capacity. It is currently considered the second largest secondary school in Scotland. The school is secondary to 7 local primary schools, including Stenhousemuir Primary, Larbert Village Primary, Ladeside Primary, Carron Primary, Kinnaird Primary, Carronshore Primary, and Airth Primary.

History
From 1886 to 1977, the school operated from its primary site on Main Street, Stenhousemuir. In November 1977, an extension to the school was opened at Carrongrange, around 500 metres from the Main Street campus. From 1977 to 2000, the school operated on a split-site basis, and this meant that between lessons, pupils had to walk (potentially up to five times per day), between the two buildings. This was criticised in the inspection of the school in 1999. In 1998, Falkirk Council opted to consolidate the school on the Carrongrange site, removing the need for students to transfer between different buildings. This was funded by the Private Finance Initiative. In early 2000, the school was opened on the one site at Carrongrange. In 2019 the school won a Parents as Partners in learning award at the Scottish Education Awards.

References

External links
Larbert High School website

Secondary schools in Falkirk (council area)
1885 establishments in Scotland
Educational institutions established in 1885
Larbert
Stenhousemuir